John Harbord, 8th Baron Suffield (1 July 1907 – 23 June 1945), of Gunton Park, near Norwich, Norfolk, was a British soldier, peer, and baronet, a member of the House of Lords from 1943 to 1945.

John Harbord was the younger of the two sons of Charles Harbord, 6th Baron Suffield and his wife Evelyn Louisa Wilson-Patten. His mother was a daughter of Captain Eustace John Wilson-Patten and Emily Constantia Thynne (1840–1926), a granddaughter of Thomas Thynne, 2nd Marquess of Bath. She later married again and became Marchioness of Headfort.

He had one older brother, elder brother Victor Alexander Charles, the 7th Baron, and two sisters, Doris Cecilia and Lettice Evelyn.

The young Harbord was educated at Gresham's School, Holt. He was commissioned into the 108th Suffolk and Norfolk Yeomanry. On 11 June 1943 he succeeded his brother as Baron Suffield (created 1786) and also became the 9th Harbord baronet (1746).

He died on 23 June 1945, unmarried, and was succeeded by a distant elderly cousin, Geoffrey Harbord (1861–1946), son of the Hon. William Harbord, third son of Edward Harbord, 3rd Baron Suffield (1781–1835).

Arms

References

1907 births
1945 deaths
People educated at Gresham's School
People from North Norfolk (district)
John 08